Sarn Gynfelyn is a shingle spit on the coast of Cardigan Bay, in the county of Ceredigion, Mid-Wales, in the United Kingdom. It is located at Wallog, a few kilometres north of Llangorwen, close to Clarach Bay, south of Borth and north of the town of Aberystwyth.

Similar landform examples are found at several points along the Cardigan Bay coast, known as sarnau. These long subtidal banks are thought to have originated as glacial moraines.

In legend

These protruding banks resemble man-made causeways and have long been part of the centuries-old legend of Cantre'r Gwaelod, a fabled sunken kingdom which was lost beneath the waters of Cardigan Bay. According to legend, Sarn Gynfelyn was one of the causeways leading to the lost land. The legend of Cantre'r Gwaelod is comparable to the deluge myth found in nearly every ancient culture, and it has been likened to the story of Atlantis.

In a 2006 episode of the BBC television documentary Coast, presenter Neil Oliver visited Sarn Gynfelyn to explore the legend of Cantre'r Gwaelod. The vista of dead oak, pine, birch, willow and hazel tree stumps preserved by the acid anaerobic conditions in the soil is revealed at low tide and is estimated to be about 5000 years old.

See also
 Sarn Badrig
Sarn y Bwch

References

External links

Photograph of Sarn Gynfelyn, 1999
Video clip: Sarn Gynfelyn Shingle spit jutting out to sea (Skyworks)

Reefs of Ceredigion
Cardigan Bay
Reefs of the Atlantic Ocean